El Trece Internacional is the international signal of El Trece from Argentina. It is a Spanish-language cable channel which broadcasts telenovelas, series, teen and children's series, comedies, entertainment programs, etc. produced by Pol-ka and Ideas del Sur. It was launched in 2009. El Trece Internacional is available in America, Europe and Argentina.

Their signal is broadcast by Intelsat 11. Also El Trece has an hd signal that is available in ONO and VTR.

Feed 
Feed Latin America and Europe (Argentina)
Feed USA

Programming 

Esperanza mía (simulcast from El Trece Satelital)
Lobo
Socias
El puntero
Signos
Guapas (simulcast from El Trece Satelital)
Showmatch (simulcast from El Trece Satelital) 
Real o no Real
A todo o nada (simulcast from El Trece Satelital)
Los 8 escalones (simulcast from El Trece Satelital)
El diario de Mariana (simulcast from El Trece Satelital
Este es el show
La mesa esta lista
Como anillo al dedo
Arriba Argentinos (simulcast from El Trece Satelital)
Noticiero Trece
Telenoche (simulcast from El Trece Satelital) 
Sintesis

References

External links
Official website
Artear
More information (In English)
Schedule

 
Television networks in Argentina
Television stations in Argentina
Clarín Group
Spanish-language television stations